"Million Voices" is a single by Swedish DJ and producer Otto Knows. The song was released in Belgium as a digital download on 31 May 2012. The song has charted in Belgium, the Netherlands, the United Kingdom and Sweden.

Music video
An accompanying music video for the song was released on 18 November 2012. It was filmed in Lésigny, Seine-et-Marne, France. As of July 2019, the video has received over 33 million views on YouTube.

Track listing
Digital download
 "Million Voices" – 5:57 (original mix)

iTunes EP

 "Million Voices (Radio Edit) - 3:13
 "Million Voices (Extended Mix) - 5:58
 "Million Voices (TORN Remix) - 6:26

Charts and certifications

Weekly charts

Year-end charts

Certifications and sales

Release history

References

2012 singles
Otto Knows songs
Songs written by Otto Knows
2011 songs
Mercury Records singles